Roger Junio Rodrigues Ferreira (born 13 March 1996), commonly known as Roger, is a Brazilian footballer who plays as a midfielder for Liga I club UTA Arad.

Career statistics

Club

Notes

Honours
Botafogo-PB
Campeonato Paraibano: 2017

Riga FC
Virslīga: 2019, 2020

CFR Cluj
Liga I: 2021–22
Supercupa României runner-up: 2022

References

1996 births
Living people
Sportspeople from Goiânia
Brazilian footballers
Brazilian expatriate footballers
Association football midfielders
Campeonato Brasileiro Série B players
Kategoria Superiore players
Latvian Higher League players
Vila Nova Futebol Clube players
Botafogo Futebol Clube (PB) players
Goiânia Esporte Clube players
Atlético Clube Goianiense players
FK Kukësi players
KS Kastrioti players
Riga FC players
Liga I players
FC UTA Arad players
Brazilian expatriate sportspeople in Albania
Expatriate footballers in Albania
Brazilian expatriate sportspeople in Latvia
Expatriate footballers in Latvia
Brazilian expatriate sportspeople in Romania
Expatriate footballers in Romania